Lucius Antistius Burrus Adventus (–188 AD) was a Roman senator who lived in the 2nd century. He was one of the sons-in-law of the Emperor Marcus Aurelius and Faustina the Younger.

Burrus originally came from a senatorial family from Thibilis, a town near Hippo Regius in the Africa Province. Although Burrus was born and raised in Thibilis, his family was not of very ancient lineage. He was the son of Quintus Antistius Adventus Aquilinus Postumus and Novia Crispina. His mother is known from an honorific inscription dedicated to her, dating from her husband's governorship of Arabia Petraea.

Quintus Antistius Adventus (born around mid-120s), during the rule of the Nerva–Antonine dynasty, served as a successful military tribune, legatus, quaestor, public construction official and governor in various provinces throughout the Roman Empire.

Sometime before the death of Marcus Aurelius, Burrus married the Emperor's youngest daughter, Vibia Aurelia Sabina, after which they returned to and settled in Thibilis. When Marcus Aurelius died in 180, Aurelia Sabina's brother Commodus succeeded her father as Emperor. In 181, Burrus served as an ordinary consul.

In 188, Antistius Burrus was involved in a conspiracy against Commodus. When this conspiracy was uncovered, Antistius Burrus was put to death. His widow later remarried; it appears she had no children by Burrus.

References

Sources
 Albino Garzetti, From Tiberius to the Antonines: a history of the Roman Empire AD 14-192, 1974
 Anthony R. Birley, The Roman Government of Britain, Oxford University Press, 2005
 Anthony R. Birley, Marcus Aurelius, Routledge, 2000
https://scholarsbank.uoregon.edu/xmlui/bitstream/handle/1794/4969/latin_literature.pdf?sequence=1
http://thecorner.wordpress.com/2006/06/21/chapter-two-septimius-and-the-cursus-honorum/

140s births
188 deaths
2nd-century executions
2nd-century Romans
Burrus, Lucius
Executed Algerian people
Executed ancient Roman people
Imperial Roman consuls
Nerva–Antonine dynasty
People executed by the Roman Empire
Senators of the Roman Empire
Year of birth uncertain